Anca Barna (born 14 May 1977) is a former German tennis player. She turned professional in 1992 and retired in 2005. On 12 April 2004, Barna reached her highest singles ranking, world No. 46. Her highest doubles ranking came on 21 April 1997, when she peaked at No. 119. Anca resides in Nuremberg, Germany. Her sister, Adriana Barna, was also a professional tennis player.

WTA career finals

Singles: 1 runner-up

ITF Circuit finals

Singles: 6 (2–4)

Doubles: 6 (2–4)

Head-to-head record
Dominique Monami 0-1
Monica Seles 0-1
Serena Williams 0-2
Venus Williams 0-1
Anastasia Myskina 0-1
Kim Clijsters 0-2
Nadia Petrova 1-1
Elena Dementieva 1-1
Justine Henin 0-3
Jelena Janković 0-1

External links
 
 
 

1977 births
Living people
German female tennis players
German people of Romanian descent
Sportspeople from Cluj-Napoca
Romanian expatriate sportspeople in Germany